Grazing incidence X-ray and neutron diffraction (GID, GIXD, GIND), typically from a crystalline structure uses small incident angles for the incoming X-ray or neutron beam, so that diffraction can be made surface sensitive. It is used to study surfaces and layers because wave penetration is limited. Distances are in the order of nanometres. Below (typically 80%) the critical angle of the surface material studied an evanescent wave is established for a short distance and is exponentially damped. Therefore, Bragg reflections are only coming from the surface structure.

An advantage of GIXD is that the electric field at the critical angle is amplified locally by a factor of four, making the signal stronger. A disadvantage is the limited in-plane spatial resolution (beam footprint).

When very small scattering angles are being studied, the technique is called grazing-incidence small-angle scattering (GISAS, GISAXS, GISANS), and requires special methodology.

History

Before synchrotron-based X-ray sources became strong enough very little research was possible.  The first paper published was by Marra and Eisenberger who used both a rotating anode x-ray source and the Stanford Synchrotron Radiation Laboratory.  Soon dedicated ultra-high-vacuum diffractometers were developed for preparing and studying surfaces in-situ, the first at SSRL and the second at the National Synchrotron Light Source.

See also 
 X-ray diffraction
 Neutron scattering

Further reading

References 

Scientific techniques